The 1950–51 Macedonian Republic League was the seventh since its establishment. Rabotnik Bitola won their second championship title.

Participating teams

Final table

References 
Karovski, Ilija (1996) FK Tikvesh 1930–1995 p. 35, 36

External links
SportSport.ba
Football Federation of Macedonia 

Macedonian Football League seasons
Yugo
3